Bílí Tygři Liberec (English: Liberec White Tigers) are a professional ice hockey club based in Liberec, Czech Republic. The team competes in the Czech Extraliga, the highest level of play in professional Czech ice hockey.

History
The first hockey club in Liberec was founded in 1934 under the name SK Rapid Horní Růžodol. After the WWII, there have been two sections: Jiskra Kolora and Tatran. In 1956, a new ice rink was built in Liberec and the clubs agreed to merge, under the name TJ Lokomotiva Liberec. Since 1961, the club have been named: Stadion Liberec.

Since 1985, the level of Liberec hockey began to decline and the team played in the third highest competition. It has been given its current name since 2000 and the team returned to the Czech Extraliga in 2002. On 5 October 2010, as the first Czech ice hockey club played on their home ice with an NHL team, specifically in the preparatory match with the Boston Bruins. In the 2015/16 season, Liberec won its first ever Czech Champion title.

Honours

Domestic
Czech Extraliga
  Winners: 2015–16
  Runners-up: 2016–17, 2018–19, 2020–21
  3rd place: 2004–05, 2006–07

Czech 1. Liga
  Winners: 2001–02
  Runners-up: 1997–98, 2000–01

Players

Current roster

References

External links
 Official website 
 Official Bílí Tygři Liberec website 

Ice hockey teams in the Czech Republic
Ice hockey teams in Czechoslovakia
HC Bílí Tygři Liberec
Ice hockey clubs established in 1956
1956 establishments in Czechoslovakia